The Moreton Telegraph Office, located on the banks of the Wenlock River was part of the Cape York Telegraph Line and was completed in 1887.

These days, Moreton is in the tourism business, offering accommodation, local tours and stories of the old days.

History 
Kaanju (also known as Kaanju and Kandju) is a language of Cape York. The Kaanju language region includes the landscape within the local government boundaries of the Cook Shire Council.

References

Buildings and structures in Far North Queensland
Telegraph stations in Australia
1887 establishments in Australia